The Galleria d'Arte Moderna is a modern art museum in Milan, in Lombardy in northern Italy. It is housed in the Villa Reale, at Via Palestro 16, opposite the Giardini Pubblici Indro Montanelli. The collection consists largely of Italian and European works from the eighteenth to the twentieth centuries.

The museum has works by Francesco Filippini, Giuseppe Ferrari, Giovanni Fattori, Silvestro Lega, Giovanni Boldini, Vincent van Gogh, Édouard Manet, Paul Gauguin, Paul Cézanne, Pablo Picasso, Giacomo Balla, Umberto Boccioni, Francesco Hayez, Giovanni Segantini, Giuseppe Pellizza da Volpedo and Antonio Canova, among others. Works have been donated by Milanese families including the Treves, Ponti, Grassi and Vismara.

After the Second World War the twentieth-century works in the collection were moved to the Padiglione d'Arte Contemporanea, built in 1955 on the site of the former stables of the palace, which had been destroyed by wartime bombing.

In 2011 some works were moved to the Museo del Novecento; these included Bambina che corre sul balcone by Giacomo Balla (1912), Uomo che dorme by Renato Guttuso (1938) and The Fourth Estate by Pellizza da Volpedo (1901).

The museum holds some temporary exhibitions; in 2008 works by Tino Sehgal were presented.

Principal works 
The principal works in the collection include:
 Francesco Hayez: Portrait of Alessandro Manzoni, 1841; Penitent Mary Magdalene, 1833; Portrait of Countess Antonietta Negroni Prati Morosini as a Child, 1858; Portrait of Matilde Juva Branca, 1851
 Giovanni Segantini: Le due madri, 1889; L'angelo della vita, 1894
 Umberto Boccioni: La madre, 1907
 Giacomo Balla: Espansione per velocità (Velocità d'automobile), 1913-14: Morbidezze di primavera, 1918
 Giuseppe De Nittis: Colazione a Posillipo, 1878: La femme aux pompons, 1879
 Pablo Picasso: Tête de femme (La Mediterranée), 1957
 Paul Gauguin: Vaches à l'abreuvoir, 1885; Donne di Tahiti, 1891
 Vincent van Gogh: Breton Women and Children, 1888
 Édouard Manet: Portrait of M. Arnaud, 1875
 Paul Cézanne: Les voleurs et l'âne, 1869

Gallery

References 

Art museums and galleries in Milan
Modern art museums in Italy
Art museums established in 1921
1921 establishments in Italy
Contemporary art galleries in Italy
Tourist attractions in Milan